Diana Dei (born Agnese Mancinelli, 1 March 1914 – 3 January 1999) was an Italian film actress. She was married to actor Mario Riva.

Selected filmography
 A Woman Has Fallen (1941)
 Honeymoon (1941)
 Baron Carlo Mazza (1948)
 The Cadets of Gascony (1950)
 Toto the Third Man (1951)
 The Mad Marechiaro (1952)
  The Country of the Campanelli (1954)
 Bravissimo (1955)
 Red and Black (1955)
 Arrivano i dollari! (1957)
 Toto, Peppino and the Fanatics (1958)

References

Bibliography
 Ann C. Paietta. Teachers in the Movies: A Filmography of Depictions of Grade School, Preschool and Day Care Educators, 1890s to the Present. McFarland, 2007.

External links

1914 births
1999 deaths
Italian film actresses
Actresses from Rome